Windham Henry Quin, 2nd Earl of Dunraven and Mount-Earl (29 September 1782 – 6 August 1850) was an Irish Peer.

Origin
He was the eldest son of Valentine Richard Quin, 1st Earl of Dunraven and Mount-Earl and Lady Frances Muriel Fox-Strangways, daughter of Stephen Fox-Strangways, 1st Earl of Ilchester, and his wife, the former Elizabeth Horner. He had one sister, Lady Harriet Quin, who married Sir William Payne-Gallwey, 1st Baronet and died in 1845.

He was styled Viscount Adare from 1822 until he succeeded to the Earldom on the death of his father in 1824. He took the additional surname of Wyndham, becoming Windham Wyndham-Quin, on 7 April 1815.

Life
He was appointed Custos Rotulorum of County Limerick for life in 1818. He served as an MP for County Limerick in the Parliament of the United Kingdom from 1806 to 1820. He was accused of corruption following the 1818 General Election, but after a full inquiry, the House of Commons exonerated him.

Marriage and children
On 27 December 1810, he married Caroline, daughter and heiress of Thomas Wyndham of Dunraven Castle, Glamorgan and Clearwell, Gloucestershire. They had the following children:
 Edwin Wyndham-Quin, 3rd Earl of Dunraven and Mount-Earl (1812–1871)
 Captain the Hon. Windham Henry Wyndham Quin (2 November 1829 – 1865), who on 24 January 1856 married Caroline, third daughter of Rear Admiral George Tyler, K.H., of Cottrell, Glamorgan, M.P., and had issue.
 Lady Anna Maria Charlotte Wyndham Quinn (November 1814 – 7 January 1855), who married William Monsell, 1st Baron Emly on 11 August 1836.

References

 Lodge, Edmund, Norroy King of Arms, &c., The Peerage of the British Empire & Baronetage, 27th edition, London, 1858, p. 203–4.

External links

1782 births
1850 deaths
Adare, Windham Quin, Lord
Quin, Windham Henry
Quin, Windham Henry
Adare, Windham Quin, Lord
Adare, Windham Quin, Lord
Dunraven and Mount-Earl, E2
Place of birth missing
Irish representative peers
Earls of Dunraven and Mount-Earl